Komm Kuscheln (English: Come Cuddle) is the third studio album by Schnuffel. It was released in Germany on 16 October 2009 by Columbia Records.

Track listing

International editions
 2010: Adj egy puszit! (Give Me a Kiss!) – Hungarian version by Snufi.
 2011: Παρέα με τοv Σνούφελ (Along with Snoufel) – Greek version by Σνούφελ το λαγουδάκι (Snoufel the Bunny). Tracks 2 and 5 are switched.

Charts

References

2009 albums
Columbia Records albums
German-language albums
Schnuffel albums